Constituted in 1964 by the Ministry of Steel, Government of India for formulating guidelines for production, allocation, pricing and distribution of iron and steel materials, Joint Plant Committee (JPC) underwent a major transformation in 1992, when following the de-regulation of Indian steel industry, it moulded itself into a facilitator for industry, focusing on giving form to a comprehensive and non-partisan databank – the first of its kind in the country – on the Indian iron and steel industry. Today, it is the only institution in the country, officially empowered by the Ministry of Steel, Government of India to collect and report data on the Indian iron and steel industry. Accredited with ISO 9001: 2008 certification, JPC is headquartered at Kolkata with regional offices in New Delhi, Kolkata, Mumbai and Chennai and an extension centre in Bhubaneswar, engaged in data collection. The Economic Research Unit (ERU) at New Delhi serves as a wing of JPC to carry out techno-economic studies and policy analysis.

Evolution of JPC 
 1964 – Constituted
JPC was constituted this year, following the recommendations of Dr. K.N Raj Committee under Clause 17B of the Iron & Steel Control Order, 1956 of the Essential Commodities Act, 1955 with the objective of planning, programming and determination of regulatory production guidelines on iron and steel, including pricing and distribution.
 
 1971 – Greater Empowerment
Vide Notification S.O. 1567/ECS.COMM/IRON &STEEL dated 7 April 1971, the Government specified in detail the composition of the Committee as well as its various functions, thereby empowering JPC with precise directions to undertake its activities.

 1992 – De-regulation of Steel Industry
Vide Notification No. SC/1/6/91/D.III dated 16 January 1992 and following the economic order of the day, Indian steel industry was de-controlled, a milestone development that led to far-reaching changes in operational practices and overall spread of industry. In this changed scenario, JPC moulded itself to be a facilitator for the Indian steel industry, focusing on the maintenance of a comprehensive, non-partisan data base on the industry – a first-time attempt to statistically enumerate industry growth.

 2003 – Closure of Office of Development Commissioner of Iron &Steel (DCI&S)
In May 2003, the Office of DCI&S, engaged primarily in data collection work for the small and medium scale sector, was closed down. This led to the entrustment of the responsibility of collection and reporting of data on all segments in the small and medium scale sectors to JPC (which was focusing on main producer till then) vide MoS Notification No. 13(13)30/2001-DI.

 2007 – Deletion of Steel From EC Act, 1955
Vide notification No 26(1)/2004-ECR&E (Vol. III) dated 12 February 2007, Ministry of Consumer Affairs, Food and Public Distribution (Department of Consumer Affairs) announced the deletion of steel from the Essential Commodities Act and Such deletion wavered the very policy foundation of the organisation.

 2008 – Notification of Ministry of Steel
Notification No. 4(5)/03-DI. dated 18 August 2008 issued by the Ministry of Steel pronounced the need for continuance of JPC in its present form, in context of its critical database :

     "…the Central Government has decided that the said Joint Plant Committee shall continue to function in its present form along with its present composition and functions…"

 JPC Today
Backed by over 4 decades of specialised experience in data management, today JPC is the only organisation in the country, officially authorised by Ministry of Steel, Government of India to collect and report on data on the Indian iron and steel industry. The JPC Database has emerged as the most trusted, comprehensive and non-partisan source of data and information on the Indian steel industry. JPC is also an ISO 9001:2008 organisation indicating the quality of service rendered.
Headquarter of JPC is in Kolkata with regional offices in New Delhi, Kolkata, Mumbai and Chennai, engaged in data collection and industry liaison.  In 2014, JPC opened its extension centre in Bhubaneswar, Odisha, in a bid to consolidate and further sharpen the accuracy of its data and data collection system at the regional level. Two more Extension Offices are to be opened, one in Raipur and the other in Bangalore as approved in the 225th meeting of the JPC Apex Committee held on 11 March 2014.
The Economic Research Unit (ERU) at New Delhi serves as a wing of JPC, mainly responsible for analysis of data collected by the JPC and for conducting specific studies/analysis entrusted to it by the Ministry of Steel.The ERU is headed by Chief Economist.

Structure and Composition of JPC  

JPC is headed by Joint Secretary to Government of India, Ministry of Steel as its chairman and has representatives from SAIL, RINL, Tata Steel and Railway Board as its esteemed Members.
 Chairman: Jt.Secretary, Ministry of Steel
 Members: 7 Members in total(4 from SAIL, 1 each from Railway Board, Tata Steel and RINL) 
 Executive Secretary is the administrative in-charge of the Organization.

JPC Database and its Management 
 JPC used its own classification system for statistical use only.

 JPC Database coverage 

 DATA Collection 

 Data Management Issues

JPC Publications

References 

Steel industry of India
Organisations based in Kolkata
Government agencies established in 1964
Trade associations based in India
Government-owned companies of India
Ministry of Steel
1964 establishments in West Bengal